Lochmaeocnemis is a genus of white-legged damselfly in the family Platycnemididae. There is one described species in Lochmaeocnemis, L. malacodora.

References

Further reading

 
 
 

Platycnemididae
Articles created by Qbugbot